Kangaamiut Kangerluarsuat Fjord (old spelling: Kangâmiut Kangerdluarssuat) is a fjord in the Qeqqata municipality in western Greenland. The fjord is located halfway between the lower runs of the long Kangerlussuaq Fjord in the north, and Kangerlussuatsiaq Fjord in the south, emptying into Davis Strait.

Geography 

The fjord flows southwestward, opening into Davis Strait, with its mouth dotted with several skerries.

Settlement 
Kangaamiut is the only settlement in the vicinity, located on a small island to the south of the fjord mouth.

See also
List of fjords of Greenland

References 

Davis Strait
Fjords of Greenland